Ruuska is a Finnish surname. Notable people with the surname include:

 Sylvia Ruuska (born 1942), American competition swimmer

See also
 Ruska (surname)

Finnish-language surnames
Surnames of Finnish origin